The Goenpul, also written Koenpal, are an Aboriginal Australian people, one of three Quandamooka peoples, who traditionally lived on the southern part of Stradbroke Island in southern Queensland. Today their preferred term for their group is Dandrubin Gorenpul.

Name
In the Brisbane area tribal, the words for 'no' used by each tribe were often selected to form the appropriate ethnonym. Both djandai and goenpul used for the Goenpul reflect this principle of nomenclature. Djandai meant the language spoken by the Goenpul, while Goenpul itself was formed from the Moreton Island term for 'no', namely goa.

Country
Stradbroke Island. On their northern boundary were the Nunukul. As one of the three tribes constituting the Quandamooka people, the others being the Nunukul and the Ngugi, they are custodians with traditional ownership rights in Moreton Bay.

Alternative names
 Coobenpil
 Djandai
 Dsandai, Tchandi
 Jandai.(djandai means = no)
 Jendairwal
 Jundai
 Noogoon (word for St. Helens Island)

Source:

Notes

Citations

Sources

Aboriginal peoples of Queensland
Brisbane